Gaetbulibacter lutimaris is a Gram-negative, rod-shaped and aerobic bacterium from the genus of Gaetbulibacter which has been isolated from sediments of tidal flat from the South Sea in Korea.

References

Flavobacteria
Bacteria described in 2013